An  is a large wooden war mallet used by the samurai class of feudal Japan. The ōtsuchi had a shaft of about 6 ft (182.88 cm) much like the ono (war axe). It was mainly used for door breaching.

Popular culture
 Powerpuff Girls Z features an otsuchi wielded by Buttercup.
 Sonic the Hedgehog features Amy Rose wielding an otsuchi.

References

Hammers
Polearms
Samurai weapons and equipment
Weapons of Japan